Deontay Wilder vs. Robert Helenius Billed as Heavyweight Showdown was a professional boxing match between former WBC heavyweight champion, Deontay Wilder, and Finnish heavyweight boxer, Robert Helenius.

The bout took place October 15, 2022, at the Barclays Center in Brooklyn, New York City.

Background
In August 2022, it was announced that Wilder will have his first fight a year later after his Fury loss. It was announced Wilder would be facing Finland's Robert Helenius, with the fight scheduled to take place on October 15, 2022, at Brooklyn's Barclays Center.

The fight
On the fight night, Wilder won via knockout with a short right hand at 2:57 of the first round.

Fight card

Reference:

References

Boxing matches
Events in New York City
2022 in boxing
2022 in sports in New York City
November 2022 sports events in the United States